Frank Sullivan may refer to:

 Frank Sullivan (baseball) (1930–2016), American baseball pitcher
 Frank Sullivan (basketball), college men's basketball coach
 Frank Sullivan (film editor) (1896–1972), American film editor
 Frank J. Sullivan (1852–?), state senator in California's 13th State Senate district
 Frank Sullivan (ice hockey, born 1898) (1898–1989),  Canadian ice hockey player for the University of Toronto Grads and Canada
 Frank Sullivan (ice hockey, born 1929) (1929–2009), Canadian ice hockey player for the Toronto Maple Leafs and Chicago Blackhawks
 Frank Sullivan (medical doctor), Scottish general practitioner and medical researcher
 Frank Sullivan (writer) (1892–1976), American journalist and humorist
 Frank Sullivan Jr. (born 1950), justice of the Indiana Supreme Court
 Frank Sullivan (American football), American football player

See also
 Francis Sullivan (disambiguation)